The 2010–11 Fogo Island League season began on 13 November and finished on 24 April.  Vulcânicos won their 09th title and qualified into the 2011 Cape Verdean Football Championships.  The championship was organized by the Fogo Regional Football Association (Associação Regional de Futebol do Fogo, ARFF).

Botafogo for the last time was the defending team of the title. A total of 18 clubs participated in the competition, 10 in the Premier Division and 8 in the Second.

Baxada and Juventude were winners of the Second Division while Desportivo de Cova Figueira and Nova Era were relegated into the Second Division for the following season. Cova Figueira has been playing in the Second Division since 2012 but Nova Era did not return until October 2017 into the Premier Division.

Competing Teams

Premier Division
Académica do Fogo
Botafogo (also as Bota Fogo)
Cutelinho FC
Luzabril
Nô Pintcha dos Mosteiros
Nova Era FC - Terra Branca subdivision, São Filipe
Spartak d'Aguadinha
Valência do Fogo
Vulcânicos

Second Division
ABC de Patim
Baxada
Brasilim
Esperança de Achada Furna
Grito Povo (or Gritu Povu) - Ribeira do Ilhéu
Juventude do Fogo
Parque Real - Cova Figueira
União de São Lourenço

Table

Premier Division

Second Division
1st: Baxada
2nd: Juventude do Fogo

References

External links
*
2010-11 Fogo Premier Division

Fogo football seasons
2010 in Cape Verdean sport
2011 in Cape Verdean sport